Fuerte de Buenos Aires was the main Spanish fortress of the city of Buenos Aires during the colonial period.

History 

The Fort of Buenos Aires was built by order of the governor Fernando de Zárate, being designated with the name of Real Fortaleza de Don Juan Baltasar de Austria. Its construction began towards the middle of 1590s, in the land where the Government House is currently located. Originally the fortress had been raised for the defense of the city against possible incursions by pirates, was also the residence of the authorities of Buenos Aires.

Among the General Staff of the Fort of Buenos Aires were the Captains Francisco Pérez de Burgos, Miguel de Riglos, Miguel Gerónimo de Esparza and his son Juan Miguel de Esparza, who had also served as Mayors of the City in various periods.

During the early 17th century, no major modifications were made to the structure of the Fort of Buenos Aires, being completely modified towards the year 1708, when the colonial authorities hired the Captain engineer José Bermúdez, who endowed the fort with a fortified wall. In 1725, the fort was modified again, this time by the engineer Domingo Petrarca.

Towards the middle of the 18th century, the Fort of Buenos Aires continued with the renovations, carried out by the Spanish engineer of British descent, Don Juan Bartolomé Howell. And later by the engineer Carlos Cabrer, who built a Chapel for the Viceroys.

During the British invasions of the River Plate, the Fort of Buenos Aires, was occupied by William Beresford, who resided in the fortification until surrendering to Santiago de Liniers. In 1810 the Fort of Buenos Aires, was used as the official residence of Cornelio Saavedra, president of the Primera Junta of Government.

In 1826, the President Bernardino Rivadavia, made important improvements in the Buenos Aires fort, including an iron gate to replace the rudimentary wooden gate.

Gallery

References 

History of South America
Río de la Plata
Buildings and structures completed in 1725